This is a list of former Australian rules football competitions in the Australian state of Tasmania.

Statewide competitions

Tasmanian State Premiership (1904–1978) 

The Tasmanian State Premiership was an Australian rules football tournament which was competed originally between the reigning TFL/TANFL and NTFA premiers, with the NWFU joining in from 1954.
The State Premiership was finally abandoned after 1978 in favour of sending a combined Tasmanian team to play interstate.

Winfield Statewide Cup (1980) 

The Winfield Statewide Cup was a football tournament held in 1980 between the top twenty-one (21) major football clubs across Tasmania from the three major footballing bodies across the state (at the time), the TANFL, the NTFA and the NWFU.

Tasmanian Amateur Football League (1931–1995)

The Amateurs controlled the two competitions (one in Hobart, the other in Launceston).

Northern Division

Commenced in 1931 with three clubs, Old Launcestions, St Patricks and Associated Banks, in 1948 the competition became known as Northern Division.

Premiers 

 1931 - St Patricks
 1932 - St Patricks
 1933 - Associated Banks
 1934 - Churinga
 1935 - St Patricks
 1936 - St Patricks
 1937 - Churinga
 1938 - Churinga
 1939 - Churinga
 1940 - Churinga
 1941 - Dark Blue Rovers
 1946 - Mowbray
 1947 - Mowbray
 1948 - St Patricks
 1949 - Mowbray
 1950 - Mowbray
 1951 - Old Launcestonians
 1952 - Old Launcestonians
 1953 - Old Launcestonians
 1954 - St Patricks
 1955 - St Patricks
 1956 - St Patricks
 1957 - Old Scotch Collegians
 1958 - Old Launcestonians
 1959 - Old Launcestonians
 1960 - Old Launcestonians
 1961 - Brooks Old Boys
 1962 - Old Launcestonians
 1963 - Brooks Old Boys
 1964 - Old Launcestonians
 1965 - Mowbray
 1966 - Mowbray
 1967 - Mowbray
 1968 - Mowbray
 1969 - Mowbray
 1970 - Old Launcestonians
 1971 - Old Launcestonians
 1972 - Mowbray
 1973 - Mowbray
 1974 - Mowbray
 1975 - Old Scotch Collegians
 1976 - Old Scotch Collegians
 1977 - Quandeine
 1978 - Old Scotch Collegians
 1979 - Quandeine
 1980 - Old Scotch Collegians
 1981 - Rocherlea
 1982 - Old Launcestonians
 1983 - Old Scotch Collegians
 1984 - St Patricks
 1985 - Rocherlea
 1986 - Old Scotch Collegians
 1987 - Northern Districts
 1988 - Rocherlea
 1989 - Longford
 1990 - Hillwood
 1991 - Rocherlea
 1992 - Hillwood
 1993 - Tamar Cats (Beauty Point-Beaconsfield)
 1994 - Uni-Mowbray
 1995 - Uni-Mowbray

Division 2

  1992 - Mowbray

  1993 - Rocherlea

Southern Division

Commenced in 1932 as Public Schools Old Boys Football Association it changed its name to TAFL Southern Division in 1947 when the two competitions merged administration.

Premiers 

 1932 - Hutchins
 1933 - Old Virgilians (St Virgils)
 1934 - Clemes
 1935 - Hutchins
 1936 - Hutchins
 1937 - Friends
 1938 - Hutchins
 1939 - Friends
 1940 - Hutchins
 1946 - Hutchins
 1947 - Old Virgilians (St Virgils)
 1948 - Old Hobartians Association (OHA)
 1949 - University
 1950 - St Virgils
 1951 - St Virgils
 1952 - St Virgils
 1953 - Ogilvenians (OTOS)
 1954 - St Virgils
 1955 - Friends
 1956 - Friends
 1957 - Lindisfarne
 1958 - Friends
 1959 - Friends
 1960 - Friends
 1961 - Hutchins
 1962 - Friends
 1963 - Hutchins
 1964 - Hutchins
 1965 - Claremont
 1966 - Sorell
 1967 - Old Hobartians Association (OHA)
 1968 - Claremont
 1969 - Old Hobartians Association (OHA)
 1970 - University
 1971 - University
 1972 - Old Hobartians Association (OHA)
 1973 - University
 1974 - Claremont
 1975 - Claremont
 1976 - Claremont
 1977 - University
 1978 - Claremont
 1979 - Claremont
 1980 - Claremont
 1981 - Claremont
 1982 - Lindisfarme
 1983 - Sorell
 1984 - Claremont
 1985 - Mangalore (Brighton Robins)
 1986 - Claremont
 1987 - Claremont
 1988 - Claremont
 1989 - Lindisfarme
 1990 - Sorell
 1991 - Lauderdale
 1992 - Claremont
 1993 - Claremont
 1994 - Claremont
 1995 - Claremont

B Grade
 1968 - Friends
 1969 - Bridgewater
 1970 - Claremont
 1971 - Old Virgilians (St Virgils)
 1972 - Hutchins

Old Scholars Division
 1981 - Hutchins
 1982 - Old Hobartians Association (OHA)
 1983 - Hutchins
 1984 - DOSA
 1985 - University
 1986 - DOSA

Local Competitions

Associated Youth Clubs (1949–1975) 
Clubs included Cambridge, Canes, Cascades, Chigwell, Lachlan, Metropolitan, Moonah, Nettlefolds, New Town Methodist, Railway, South West, Warrane, West Hobart

This competition disbanded then reorganized themselves into the Southern Tasmanian Football Association (1976–1986)

PREMIERS

 1949 - South West
 1950 - New Town Methodist
 1951 - New Town Methodist
 1952 -
 1953 - Cascades
 1954 - Cascades
 1955 - Cascades
 1956 - Cascades
 1957 - Nettlefolds
 1958 - Chigwell
 1959 - Nettlefolds
 1960 - Chigwell
 1961 - Canes
 1962 - Canes
 1963 - West Hobart
 1964 - Metropolitan
 1965 - Railway
 1966 - Metropolitan
 1967 - Canes
 1968 - Cambridge
 1969 - Canes
 1970 - Canes
 1971 - Railway
 1972 - West Hobart
 1973 - West Hobart
 1974 - Metropolitan
 1975 - West Hobart

Bellerive Football Association (1903) 
Clubs included Bellerive and Union. Lasted one season

Premiers
 1903 Bellerive

Beaconsfield Football Association (?-1914) 
The Beaconsfield Football association began before the end of the 19th century and was made up of teams from the town of Beaconsfield. The league was forced into recess in 1915 because of the first world war. After the war the league was not resurfaced because of the demise of the towns goldmine and its population.

Teams in the competition included Stars, Rovers, and Battery

Premiers 

 1904 - Stars 4.8 (32) d Rovers 1.6 (12)
 1905 - Imperial
 1906 -
 1907 -
 1908 -
 1909 - Battery d Rovers by 12 Points
 1910 - 
 1911 -
 1912 - Stars 9.7 (61) d Rovers 5.17 (47)
 1913 -
 1914 - Stars

Bothwell District Football Association 
(Also known as the Southern Tasmanian Country Football Association)

Clubs included Montacute, Dennistoun, Ouse, Bothwell, and Ellendale.

Premiers
 1934 Dennistoun defeated Montacute

Bream Creek Football Association 
Competing Teams Unknown. A Bream Creek combined side played a combined Tasmanian Football Association side in 1927.

Brighton Football Association 
Formed in 1922. Clubs over the ensuing period included Bridgewater, Broadmarsh, Kempton, Brighton, Bagdad and Bothwell

Premiers
 1922 Brighton declared premiers (on points)
 1929 Brighton 9.13.67 defeated Bothwell 5.8.38 (Brighton's captain/coach in the game was the legendary Tasmanian Footballer Horrie Gorringe)
 1930 Bothwell are premiers

Buckingham Football Association 
The Buckingham football association was most likely based around the Hobart suburb of New Town. 
Clubs included Newtown United, Fitzroy, and Maypole Rovers.

Central Association (1923–1949) 

Teams included Deloraine, Westbury, Bracknell, Meander, Mole Creek, Kimberley, Longford and Dunorlan.

Premiers:
 1934 – Westbury 11.4 (70) d Deloraine 5.11 (41)
 1944 – Deloraine 7.7 (49) d Westbury 7.6 (48)
 1945 – Bracknell 6.16 (52) d Deloraine 7.8 (50)
 1946 – Meander 7.15 (57) d Mole Creek 7.12 (54)
 1947 – Meander 15.18 (108) d Kimberley 10.8 (68)
 1948 – Mole Creek 9.17 (71) d Meander 4.19.43
 1949 – Mole Creek 13.12 (90) d Meander 4.6 (30)

Central Football Association 
Clubs included Lefroy Juniors, Carlton, and Newtown Juniors.

Premiers
 1934 Lefroy Juniors

Channel Football Association (1908–1928)
A forerunner to the Kingborough Football Association
Clubs included Gordon, Kettering, Kingston (1908), Margate, Sandfly and Woodbridge. 
Member clubs competed for the Warren Shield.

Premiers
 1908 - Sandfly
 1920 - Woodbridge 5.7 (37) d Kettering 0.5 (5)
 1921 - Gordon 4.10 (34) d Woodbridge 3.6 (24)
 1922 - Gordon 2.13 (25) d Kettering 2.8 (20)
 1923 - 
 1924 - Sandfly 7.7 (49) d Woodbridge 3.3 (21)
 1925 - Woodbridge
 1926 - Woodbridge
 1927 - Woodbridge
 1928 - Sandfly 7.7 (49) d Kettering 5.3 (33)

Channel Junior Football Association 
Clubs included Snug, Margate, and Kingston.

Chudleigh Football Association (1926–1939) 

Clubs included Chudleigh, Cressy, Dairy Plains, Kimberley, Meander, Mole Creek, Red Hills.

Premiers

 1926 - 
 1927 - Chudleigh
 1928 - Chudleigh
 1929 - 
 1930 - 
 1931 - Mole Creek
 1932 - Meander
 1933 - 
 1934 - Mole Creek
 1935 - Cressy
 1936 - Cressy
 1937 - 
 1938 - Kimberley
 1939 - Kimberley

City and Suburban Football Association 
Clubs included Cressy Rovers, Timms Bridge, Blundstones and New Town Gymnasium.

City Football Association 
Clubs included Gray Brothers, Derwent United, Neptune Oils, Standfast, Maypole Rovers, Lindisfarne, and Bellerive Juniors.

Premiers
 1933 - Derwent United 8.5 (53) d Gray Brothers 5.10 (40)
 1934 - Gray Brothers 13.8 (86) d Lindisfarne 7.5.47

Clare Street Football Association 
Clubs included Carlton Rovers, Risdon Rovers, Union Rovers, IXL Juniors, Swan Street, North Hobart Rovers, New Town Wanderers, City Rovers, South United and YMCA.

Premiers
 1921 - South United 3.3 (21) d YMCA 2.4 (16)
 1922 - City Rovers d Union Rovers by 6 points
 1923 - 
 1924 - Union Rovers 7.3 (45) d Carlton Rovers 3.8 (26)
 1925 - Carlton Rovers 6.15 (51) d Union Rovers 4.14 (38)
 1926 - Carlton Rovers 7.9 (51) d Union Rovers 2.14 (26)

Clarence Football Association 
Clubs included Lindisfarne (-1948), IXL, Bellerive, Cambridge and Aikens.

Clarence Sub District Football Association 
Clubs included Canes, Gadsdens, Clarence Colts, Lindisfarne, Sandfly, South Hobart, Montagu Bay, Forcett, Sorell, Ralphs Bay and Warrane.

Premiers
 1948 - Sandfly v Canes (Result Unknown)
 1949 - South Hobart d Sandfly
 1950 - Forcett d South Hobart
 1951 - South Hobart d Sorell
 1952 - Sorell 11.12 (78) d Forcett 5.15 (45)
 1953 - Competition in Recess
 1954 - Competition in Recess
 1955 - Competition in Recess
 1956 - Competition in Recess
 1957 - Warrane d Forcett
 1958 - Canes d Ralphs Bay

Coastal Rovers Football Association 
Clubs included Pioneer, Winnaleah, Weldborough, North Derby, Moorina and Gladstone.

Premiers
 1934 - Pioneer 9.18 (72) d Moorina 8.7 (55)
 1935 - Pioneer 25.22 (172) d North Derby 7.8 (50)
 1936 - Pioneer 6.19 (55) d Moorina 7.11 (53)

Cullenswood Football Association 
Competing clubs included Mt Nicholas, Cornwall, Avoca, Jubilee, St Marys, Fingal and Mangana.

Premiers
 1932 - Mt Nicholas
 1933 - Mt Nicholas
 1934 - Cornwall
 1935 - St Marys

Deloraine Football Association (1950–1983) 
Clubs included: Chudleigh, Elizabeth Town, Hagley, Meander, Mole Creek, Red Hills

Premiers

 1950 - Mole Creek 11.2 (68) d Chudleigh 5.7 (37)
 1951 - Mole Creek 10.12 (72) d Meander 3.13 (31)
 1952 - Meander 7.13 (55) d Elizabeth Town 5.8 (38)
 1953 - Meander 4.5 (29) d Elizabeth Town 3.7 (25)
 1954 - Red Hills 9.14 (68) d Mole Creek 9.13 (67)
 1955 - Mole Creek 11.9 (75) d Red Hills 10.12 (72)
 1956 - Red Hills 5.10 (40) d Meander 3.6 (24)
 1957 - Red Hills 11.11 (77) d Mole Creek 9.8 (62)
 1958 - Mole Creek 7.7 (49) d Meander 6.12 (48)
 1959 - Chudleigh 9.15 (69)d Mole Creek 7.5 (47)
 1960 - Mole Creek 15.12 (102) d Chudleigh 14.9 (93)
 1961 - Elizabeth Town 11.6 (72) d Meander 7.7 (49)
 1962 - Chudleigh 15.13 (103) d Elizabeth Town 9.13 (67)
 1963 - Mole Creek 10.14 (74) d Chudleigh 10.11 (71)
 1964 - Chudleigh 7.13 (55) d Red Hills 6.6 (42)
 1965 - Red Hills 10.15 (75) d Meander 10.9 (69)
 1966 - Red Hills 10.14 (74) d Chudleigh 9.11 (65)
 1967 - Red Hills 11.7 (73) d Mole Creek 3.11 (29)
 1968 - Mole Creek 13.14 (92) d Red Hills 9.13 (67)
 1969 - Mole Creek 17.12 (114) d Chudleigh 17.5 (107)
 1970 - Mole Creek 13.16 (94) d Red Hills 7.8 (50)
 1971 - Mole Creek 15.9 (99) d Hagley 7.9 (51)
 1972 - Hagley 14.8 (92) d Mole Creek 10.9 (69)
 1973 - Chudleigh 12.15 (87) d Mole Creek 8.15 (63)
 1974 - Hagley 17.6 (108) d Elizabeth Town 11.14 (80)
 1975 - Hagley 8.9 (57) d Chudleigh 8.8 (56)
 1976 - Elizabeth Town 7.12 (54) d Meander 4.10 (34)
 1977 - Mole Creek 13.16 (94) d Meander 9.13 (67)
 1978 - Meander 18.20 (128) d Chudleigh 12.8 (80)
 1979 - Meander 6.16 (52) d Chudleigh 7.8 (50)
 1980 - Mole Creek 9.8 (62) d Red Hills 3.13 (31)
 1981 - Red Hills 23.18 (156) d Chudleigh 6.11 (47)
 1982 - Red Hills 16.17 (113) d Chudleigh 7.11 (53)
 1983 - Red Hills 10.8 (68) d Hagley 5.10 (40)

Denison Football Association 
Clubs included Derwent, Glebe Juniors, Lindisfarne and Rialannah (Mt Nelson). 
Premiers
 1914 - Derwent

Derby Football Association 
Clubs included North and City. 
The two clubs participated for the Diggers Cup.

Premiers 
 1933 - North 5.16 (46) d City 5.12 (42)

Derwent Football Association 
Clubs included Fitzroy, Cananore, Lefroy Juniors, Crescent, Bellerive, Imperials, Union, New Town, Holebrook, Standfast, East Hobart and Trinity.

Premiers
 1902 - Fitzroy
 1903 - Lefroy Juniors
 1904 - Cananore
 1905 - Crescent
 1906 - Imperials
 1907 - Bellerive
 1908 - Crescent

Derwent Juniors Football Association 
Clubs included Imperials, Lefroy Juniors, Cananore Juniors, and Bellerive.

Derwent Valley Football Association (1933–1954)

Clubs included: Australian Newsprint Mills (ANM), Bothwell, Bronte, Butlers Gorge, Hamilton, Lachlan, Lower Derwent, Molesworth, Ouse, Plenty, Rosegarland, Upper Derwent, Westerway.

East Coast Football Association (1909–1958) 
Clubs included Buckland, Nugent, Orford, Runnymede, Swansea, Spring Bay, Cranbrook, Triabunna, Sorell, Buckland-Orford, Woodsdale, Nugent, Copping, and Forcett.
The ECFA folded at the completion of the 1958 season.

Premiers
 1909 - Runnymede
 1910 - Runnymede
 1914 - Buckland
 1923 - Swansea
 1924 - Swansea d Spring Bay
 1926 - Spring Bay
 1928 - Spring Bay
 1945 - Triabunna v Nugent (Result Unknown)
 1946 - Spring Bay 8.7 (55) d Copping 4.14 (38)
 1947 - Triabunna d Buckland by 18 points.
 1948 - Buckland-Orford 10.11 (71) d Triabunna 9.12 (66)
 1949 - Swansea d Triabunna by 10 points.
 1950 - Triabunna 9.10 (64) d Buckland-Orford 6.17 (53)
 1951 - Swansea 6.24 (60) d Triabunna 6.20 (56)
 1952 - Triabunna 19.8 (122) d Swansea 8.20 (68)
 1953 - Swansea d Triabunna by 45 points.
 1954 - Sorell d Swansea.
 1955 - Swansea 12.9 (81) dTriabunna 7.11 (53)
 1956 - Swansea 10.15 (75) d Triabunna 10.10 (70)
 1957 - Swansea 10.15 (75) d Triabunna 9.9 (63)
 1958 - Swansea

Best and Fairest
 1955 - Phil McConnon (Triabunna)
 1956 - Phil McConnon (Triabunna)
 1957 - Phil McConnon (Triabunna)

East Coast Union Football Association 
Competing clubs included St Marys, St Helens and Union Rovers.

East Devon Football Association (1905-?) 
Formed in 1905. Clubs included Moriarty, Sassafras, Harford and Latrobe.

East Tamar Football Association (1946–1969) 
Clubs included George Town, Hillwood, Karoola, Lebrina, Lefroy *, Lilydale, Newstead, Rocherlea, St Leonards. 
 Not to be confused with Lefroy Football Club that participated in the Tasmanian Football League from 1898–1941.

Premiers

 1946 – Karoola 7.12 (54) d Lilydale 5.15 (45)
 1947 – Lefroy 9.11 (65) d Lilydale 4.9 (33)
 1948 – Lefroy 12.5 (77) d Karoola 9.8 (62)
 1949 – Lefroy 10.10 (70) d Lilydale 8.8 (56)
 1950 – Lilydale 9.7 (61) d Karoola 9.5 (59)
 1951 – Lilydale 8.10 (58) d Hillwood 4.6 (30)
 1952 – Lilydale 6.11 (47) d Lebrina 5.10 (40)
 1953 – Lilydale 13.13 (91) d Lebrina 9.2 (56)
 1954 – Rocherlea 11.13 (79) d Lilydale 10.11 (71)
 1955 – Hillwood 12.12 (84) d Lilydale 10.8 (68)
 1956 – Lilydale 7.11 (53) d Hillwood 5.5 (35)
 1957 – George Town 7.5 (47) d Lilydale 4.4 (28)
 1958 – George Town 14.12 (96) d Lilydale 5.13 (43)
 1959 – Hillwood 12.11 (83) d Lilydale 7.11 (53)
 1960 – Hillwood 13.4 (82) d Lilydale 9.8 (62)
 1961 – Hillwood 13.12 (90) d Karoola 11.15 (81)
 1962 – Karoola 9.10 (64) d Lilydale 8.9 (57)
 1963 – George Town 14.16 (100) d Lilydale 12.13 (85)
 1964 – Hillwood 8.13 (61) d Karoola 3.8 (26)
 1965 – George Town 16.11 (107) d Lilydale 6.7 (43)
 1966 – Hillwood 13.17 (95) d George Town 3.12 (30)
 1967 – Hillwood 11.15 (81) d Rocherlea 10.9 (69)
 1968 – Hillwood 16.10 (106) d George Town 6.15 (51)
 1969 – Lilydale 10.6 (66) d Hillwood 7.3 (45)

Merged with the West Tamar Football Association after the construction of the Batman Bridge over the Tamar River in 1968.

Eastern Football Association 
Competing clubs included Fingal and St Helens.

Emu Bay Football League (1942) 
Formed in 1942 and lasted just that season. 
Premiers
 1942 Emu Bay

Esk Football Association (1926–1983) 

Clubs included: Cressy, Bishopsbourne, Deloraine, Evandale, Hagley, Poatina, Perth, Westbury

Premiers            
 1930 - Longford Juniors.     
 1931 - Bracknell 5.8 (38) d Longford Juniors 5.4 (34)
 1932 - Cressy 9.15 (69) d Bracknell 5.13 (43)
 1933 - Evandale 11.15 (81) d Bracknell 9.12 (66)
 1934 - Cressy 11.13 (79) d Evandale 5.12 (42)
 1935 - Cressy 8.9 (57) d Evandale 6.7 (43)
 1936 - Cressy 8.12 (60) d Perth 6.13 (49)
 1937 - Bracknell 6.11 (47) d Longford Juniors 6.7 (43)
 1938 - Bracknell 10.11 (71) d Longford Juniors 8.12 (60)
 1939 - Bracknell 9.11 (65) d Cressy 4.8 (32)
 1940 - Bracknell 14.17 (101) d Cressy 7.11 (53)
 1945 - Perth 7.8 (50) d Cressy 7.7 (49)
 1946 - Bracknell 11.18 (84) d Cressy 7.10 (52)
 1947 - Longford Juniors 12.12 (84) d Bishopsbourne 10.5 (65)
 1948 - Bishopsbourne 10.11 (71) d Cressy 8.8 (56)
 1949 - Bracknell 12.10 (82) d Cressy 6.3 (39)
 1950 - Hagley 7.4 (46) d Bishopsbourne 4.14 (38)
 1951 - Hagley 11.8 (74) d Cressy 6.16 (52)
 1952 - Hagley 10.15 (75) to Perth 10.7 (67)
 1953 - Hagley 11.10 (76) d Perth 11.8 (74)
 1954 - Hagley 11.10 (76) d Cressy 9.13 (67)
 1955 - Evandale 8.8 (56) d Cressy 5.8 (38)
 1956 - Bracknell 14.10 (94) d Evandale 6.7 (43)
 1957 - Bracknell 14.7 (91) d Hagley 7.11 (53)
 1958 - Evandale 12.20 (92) d Hagley 12.10 (82)
 1959 - Bracknell 13.14 (92) d Cressy 6.12 (48)
 1960 - Bracknell 13.9 (87) d Cressy 6.8 (44)
 1961 - Bracknell 16.28 (124) d Poatina 8.15 (63)
 1962 - Bracknell 9.10 (64) d Poatina 8.9 (57)
 1963 - Bracknell 11.14 (80) d Poatina 11.13 (79)
 1964 - Bracknell 12.19 (91) d Perth 6.4 (40)
 1965 - Bracknell 9.6 (60) d Cressy 8.6 (54)
 1966 - Westbury 12.15 (87) d Cressy 12.12 (84)
 1967 - Cressy 8.9 (57) d Westbury 8.4 (52)
 1968 - Deloraine 6.16 (52) d Cressy 7.6 (48) 
 1969 - Cressy 12.8 (80) d Bracknell 7.14 (56)
 1970 - Evandale 8.16 (64) d Perth 5.12 (42)
 1971 - Perth 11.11 (77) d Deloraine 10.8 (68)
 1972 - Westbury 6.21 (57) d Cressy 4.6 (30)
 1973 - Deloraine 13.9 (87) d Evandale 8.12 (60)
 1974 - Evandale 10.18 (78) d Cressy 9.9 (63)
 1975 - Deloraine 8.6 (54) d Evandale 5.9 (39)
 1976 - Deloraine 10.12 (72) d Perth 7.14 (56)
 1977 - Bracknell 12.21 (93) d Westbury 11.8 (74)
 1978 - Deloraine 11.8 (74) d Bracknell 6.9 (45)
 1979 - Deloraine 19.12 (126) d Perth 9.11 (65)
 1980 - Westbury 7.19 (61) d Bracknell 8.11 (59)
 1981 - Westbury 11.6 (72) d Bracknell 10.10 (70)
 1982 - Bracknell 17.7 (109) d Deloraine 13.9 (87)
 1983 - Perth 12.15 (87) d Deloraine 11.8 (74)   
     
Competition merged with the Deloraine FA to form the Esk-Deloraine Football Association.

Esk-Deloraine Football Association (1984–1997) 

All clubs joined Northern Tasmanian Football Association in 1998.

Premiers

 1984 - Perth 14.10 (94) d Westbury 6.12 (48)
 1985 - Bracknell 19.14 (128) d Perth 9.13 (67)
 1986 - Perth 8.12 (60) d Hagley 6.6 (42)
 1987 - Perth 15.17 (107) d Bracknell 6.6 (42)
 1988 - Perth 17.9 (111) d Cressy 10.6 (66)
 1989 - Perth 23.8 (146) d Evandale 16.7 (103)
 1990 - Perth 11.16 (82) d Bracknell 11.12 (78)
 1991 - Hagley 14.10 (94) d Evandale 8.9 (57)
 1992 - Evandale 20.9 (129) d Hagley 17 6 (108)
 1993 - Evandale 25.11 (161) d Hagley 17.5 (107)
 1994 - Bracknell 13.14 (92) d Hagley 7.15 (57)
 1995 - Cressy 11.16 (82) d Evandale 9.15 (69)
 1996 - Westbury 14.13 (97) d Hagley 13.7 (85)
 1997 - Bracknell 15.10 (100) d Hagley 11.8 (74)

Esperance Football Association (1922–1967) 
Clubs included Dover, Raminea, Southport and Glendevie. 
Premiers

 1922 - (Unknown)
 1923 - (Unknown)
 1924 - (Unknown)
 1925 - (Unknown)
 1926 - (Unknown)
 1927 - (Unknown)
 1928 - (Unknown)
 1929 - (Unknown)
 1930 - (Unknown)
 1931 - (Unknown)
 1932 - (Unknown)
 1933 - (Unknown)
 1934 - (Unknown)
 1935 - (Unknown)
 1936 - (Unknown)
 1937 - (Unknown)
 1938 - Southport d Dover.
 1939 - Raminea d Dover.
 1940 - Southport d Dover.
 1941 - Recess
 1942 - Recess
 1943 - Recess
 1944 - Recess
 1945 - Recess
 1946 - Dover d Southport.
 1947 - Dover d Southport.
 1948 - Dover d Southport.
 1949 - Dover d Southport.
 1950 - Southport d Dover.
 1951 - Southport d Dover.
 1952 - (Unknown)
 1953 - Southport d Glendevie.
 1954 - Raminea d Southport.
 1955 - Dover d Glendevie.
 1956 - Glendevie d Dover.
 1957 - Glendevie d Southport.
 1958 - Glendevie d Raminea.
 1959 - Glendevie d Southport.
 1960 - Glendevie d Dover.
 1961 - Dover d Raminea.
 1962 - Glendevie d Dover.
 1963 - Glendevie d Raminea.
 1964 - Raminea d Glendevie.
 1965 - Raminea d Glendevie.
 1966 - Dover d Glendevie.
 1967 - Dover d Glendevie.

After struggling for many years with attracting players, the Esperance FA embarked on a plan of combining all four clubs to form the 'Esperance Football Club', playing out of Dover and put in an official submission to join the Huon Football Association for the 1968 season. 
In September 1967 the Huon FA formally rejected the application, and as a result, in early 1968 all clubs and the Association went into recess and never restarted.

Federal Football League (1902) 
Formed in 1902 and lasted just that season. Clubs included Emu Bay and Penguin.

Premiers
 1902 - Emu Bay d Penguin.

Fingal District Football Association 

Clubs included Avoca, Campbell Town, Cornwall, Cullenswood, Fingal, Mathinna, Mt. Nicholas, Rossarden, St. Helens, St. Marys, and Swansea. A short history can be found here.

Flinders Island Football Association 
Teams comprised North Flinders Island and South Flinders Island. Games were played at Whitemark.

Forrest Hills Cup Football Association 
Clubs included Tyenna, Westerway Upper Derwent Juniors and National Park.

Premiers
 1922 - Tyenna
 1923 - Tyenna
 1924 - Westaway
 1925 - National Park
 1926 - (Unknown)
 1927 - Upper Derwent Juniors

Franklin Football Association 
Competing clubs unknown.

George Town Football League 
Competing clubs included Georgetown, Hillwood and Lefroy*
 1932 Lefroy 15.14 (104) d Hillwood 5.3 (33)

Glenorchy Suburban Football Association 
Clubs included Glenorchy Rovers, Claremont Flyers, Bellerive, Bridgewater, Montrose, Derwent Rovers and Granton. 
Premiers
 1931 - Glenorchy Rovers
 1932 - Montrose
 1933 - Glenorchy Rovers 7.9 (51) d Montrose 6.10 (46)

Greater Northern Football League (1981–1982) 

The Greater Northern Football League (GNFL) was a competition played between the fifteen major football clubs across Northern Tasmania from the two major footballing bodies across the north of the state, the Northern Tasmanian Football Association (NTFA), and the North West Football Union (NWFU) in 1981 and 1982.

Hobart Central Football Association 
Clubs included Derwent, Lenah Valley, Sandy Bay Rovers, and Glenorchy.

Hobart Football Association 
Clubs included Old Hobartians, West Hobart, University, and Postal Electricians.

Hobart Junior Football Association 
(Changed name to Southern Tasmanian Football Association in 1910)

Clubs included: Collingwood, Empire, Derwent, North Hobart Juniors, Hobart Central, and Crescent "B".

Premierships
 1906 – Collingwood
 1907 – Collingwood
 1908 – Collingwood
 1909 – unknown

Holebrook Football Association 
Clubs included: Training College, Presbyterian, Melville Street, New Town, Rovers and Buckingham. 
Premiers
 1906 – Training College
 1907 – unknown
 1908 – Presbyterians
 1909 – Training College
 1910 – Buckingham

Huon Football Association (1887-1997)
Clubs included Cygnet (Lovett), Huonville (Picnic), Franklin, Kermandie (Liverpool), Channel and Kingston 
Channel and Kingston entered the HFA in 1967.
The competition struggled during the 1990s culminating with the loss of Channel and Kingston to the STFL in 1996, the Huon FA folded at the end of the 1997 season with the remaining clubs joining the STFL/SFL.
Huonville and Franklin merged to become the Huonville Lions, with Cygnet and Kermandie also having to adopt alternate playing uniforms and emblems upon joining the SFL.

PREMIERS

 1887 - (Unknown)
 1888 - (Unknown)
 1889 - (Unknown)
 1890 - (Unknown)
 1891 - (Unknown)
 1892 - (Unknown)
 1893 - (Unknown)
 1894 - (Unknown)
 1895 - Franklin
 1896 - (Unknown)
 1897 - Kermandie
 1898 - (Unknown)
 1899 - (Unknown)
 1900 - (Unknown)
 1901 - (Unknown)
 1902 - (Unknown)
 1903 - Franklin
 1904 - Huonville
 1905 - Kermandie
 1906 - Franklin
 1907 - Franklin
 1908 - (Unknown)
 1909 - (Unknown)
 1910 - Kermandie
 1911 - Kermandie
 1912 - Lovett (Cygnet)
 1913 - Lovett (Cygnet)
 1914 - Franklin
 1915 - Cygnet
 1916 - Kermandie
 1917 - Franklin
 1918 - Franklin
 1919 - Kermandie
 1920 - Kermandie
 1921 - Franklin
 1922 - Cygnet
 1923 - Cygnet
 1924 - Kermandie
 1925 - Cygnet
 1926 - Cygnet
 1927 - Kermandie
 1928 - Cygnet
 1929 - Kermandie 9.10 (64) d Cygnet 5.17 (47)
 1930 - Kermandie 7.12 (54) d Cygnet 7.5 (47) 
 1931 - Cygnet
 1932 - Franklin 9.10 (64) d Huonville 7.15 (57) 
 1933 - Huonville 13.5 (83) d Franklin 10.10 (70)
 1934 - Kermandie (Awarded premiership after Huonville played an unregistered player)
 1935 - Cygnet 
 1936 - Kermandie 10.16 (76) d Franklin 9.9 (63) 
 1937 - Kermandie 
 1938 - Cygnet
 1939 - Kermandie 8.9 (57) d Cygnet 5.15 (45) 
 1940 - Recess
 1941 - Recess
 1942 - Recess
 1943 - Recess
 1944 - Recess
 1945 - Cygnet
 1946 - Kermandie 13.12 (90) d Cygnet 8.9 (57) 
 1947 - Cygnet
 1948 - Cygnet
 1949 - Kermandie 12.8 (80) d Cygnet 10.18 (78) 
 1950 - Cygnet 16.14 (110) d Huonville 11.9 (75) 
 1951 - Cygnet
 1952 - Kermandie 13.7 (85) d Cygnet 9.9 (63) 
 1953 - Huonville
 1954 - Kermandie
 1955 - Cygnet
 1956 - Kermandie
 1957 - Cygnet
 1958 - Franklin
 1959 - Franklin
 1960 - Cygnet
 1961 - Kermandie
 1962 - Cygnet
 1963 - Franklin
 1964 - Cygnet
 1965 - Kermandie
 1966 - Cygnet
 1967 - Cygnet
 1968 - Cygnet
 1969 - Kermandie
 1970 - Cygnet
 1971 - Huonville
 1972 - Cygnet
 1973 - Huonville
 1974 - Cygnet
 1975 - Channel
 1976 - Cygnet
 1977 - Channel
 1978 - Channel
 1979 - Cygnet
 1980 - Kingston
 1981 - Channel
 1982 - Franklin
 1983 - Channel 23.23 (161) d Cygnet 12.6 (78) 
 1984 - Cygnet 23.10 (148) d Franklin 11.12 (78)
 1985 - Franklin 20.19 (139) d Kingston 17.16 (118)
 1986 - Channel 17.8 (110) d Huonville 13.14 (92)
 1987 - Franklin
 1988 - Channel
 1989 - Huonville
 1990 - Channel
 1991 - Kingston
 1992 - Huonville
 1993 - Kermandie
 1994 - Cygnet
 1995 - Kingston
 1996 - Kermandie 13.14 (92) d Franklin 12.13 (85)
 1997 - Franklin d Cygnet

Huon District Football Association 
Clubs included: Ranelagh, Mountain River, Glen Huon and Crabtree.

Premiers
 1946 – Ranelagh 12.7 (79) d Mountain River 5.3 (33)
 1947 – Glen Huon
 1948 – Glen Huon 11.13 (79) d Mountain River 10.0 (60)

Kentish Football Association (1926–1954)
Clubs included: Barrington, Sheffield, West Kentish and Wilmot.

Premiers

 1926 - (Unknown)
 1927 - Wilmot 9.15 (69) d Sheffield 5.6 (36)
 1928 - Sheffield 8.9 (57) d Wilmot 8.8 (56)
 1929 - Wilmot 8.4 (52) d West Kentish 5.16 (46)
 1930 - Wilmot
 1931 - Sheffield 8.4 (52) d West Kentish 6.12 (48)
 1932 - (Unknown)
 1933 - (Unknown)
 1934 - Wilmot 9.15 (69) d Barrington 9.10 (64)
 1935 - Wilmot
 1936 - Wilmot 10.12 (72) d West Kentish 8.7 (55)
 1937 - (Unknown)
 1938 - (Unknown)
 1939 - West Kentish
 1940 - West Kentish d Stoodley
 1946 - West Kentish 8.4 (52) d Barrington 4.6 (30)
 1947 - Wilmot 9.14 (68) d Sheffield 9.9 (63)
 1948 - Sheffield d Barrington
 1949 - Sheffield d Barrington
 1950 - West Kentish d Barrington
 1951 - Sheffield d Barrington
 1952 - West Kentish 8.17 (65) d Barrington 2.10 (22)
 1953 - Barrington 4.8 (32) d Sheffield 4.3 (27)
 1954 - Sheffield 15.18 (108) d Barrington 4.8 (32)

Kermandie Football Association (1912)
Clubs included: Kermandie, Geeveston, Castle Forbes Bay.

Formed when the Kermandie Football Club were late registering for the Huon Football Association in 1912, and subsequently were left out of the fixture.

Kingborough Football Association (1929–1966) 
In 1929 the Channel Football Association voted to change its name to the Kingborough Football Association. 
Clubs included Kettering, Kingston, Longley, Margate, Sandfly, Snug, and Woodbridge.
The Kingborough and Huon Football Associations were in merger talks for three years prior to the 1967 Southern Tasmanian bushfires which destroyed the region.
All clubs with the exception of Kingston merged to create the Channel Football Club. Channel and Kingston then commenced in the Huon Football Association.

Premiers
 1929 - Woodbridge
 1930 - Kingston
 1931 - Woodbridge
 1932 - (Unknown)
 1933 - Kingston
 1934 - Sandfly
 1935 - Margate
 1936 - Kingston
 1937 - Sandfly
 1938 - Sandfly
 1939 - Sandfly
 1940-1944 - Recess
 1945 - Sandfly
 1946 - Sandfly
 1947 - Kettering
 1948 - Kingston
 1949 - Margate
 1950 - Margate
 1951 - Margate
 1952 - Margate
 1953 - Kingston
 1954 - Snug
 1955 - Kettering
 1956 - Snug
 1957 - Snug
 1958 - Kingston
 1959 - Margate
 1960 - Kingston
 1961 - Kingston
 1962 - Margate
 1963 - Margate
 1964 - Kettering
 1965 - Kingston
 1966 - Kingston

Latrobe Football Association (1925–1953)
Clubs included Deloraine, Harford, Kingston, Latrobe Rovers, Railton, Cement Rovers, Goliath, Sassafras, Sheffield, and Moriarty.

PREMIERS

 1925 - Railton
 1926 - Sassafras
 1927 - Latrobe Rovers
 1928 - Sassafras
 1929 - Railton
 1930 - Railton
 1931 - Cement Rovers
 1932 - Railton
 1933 - Railton
 1934 - Railton
 1935 - Sassafras
 1936 - Goliath
 1937 - Railton
 1938 - Deloraine
 1939 - Railton
 1940 - (Unknown)
 1946 - (Unknown)
 1947 - (Unknown)
 1948 - Moriarty
 1949 - Sassafras
 1950 - Sassafras
 1951 - Sassafras
 1952 - Moriarty
 1953 - Latrobe United

Lilydale District Football Association 
Competing clubs included: Lilydale, Lebrina, Karoola, Tunnel, Pipers River, Bangor, Nabowla, Scottsdale, Scottsdale Juniors and Bridstowe Rovers.

PREMIERS
 1921 – Lebrina
 1922 - (Unknown)
 1923 - Lilydale 7.0 (42) d Bangor 1.6 (12)
 1924 - (Unknown)
 1925 - (Unknown)
 1926 - Scottsdale Juniors d Lebrina by 18 points
 1927 - (Unknown)
 1928 - Lilydale 7.6 (48) d Scottsdale Juniors 6.11 (47)
 1929 - (Unknown)
 1930 - (Unknown)
 1931 - (Unknown)
 1932 - (Unknown)
 1933 - Lebrina 8.6 (54) d Karoola 8.5 (53)
 1934 - (Unknown)
 1935 - (Unknown)
 1936 - (Unknown)
 1937 - Scottsdale 10.11 (71) d Lilydale 10.7 (67)

Lower Derwent Football Association 
(Later called the Derwent Valley Junior Football Association)

Clubs included: Lower Derwent, Lachlan, Plenty, Molesworth, Upper Derwent and Rosegarland.

PREMIERS
 1932 - Lower Derwent
 1933 - Lower Derwent
 1934 - Lower Derwent
 1935 - (Unknown)
 1936 - (Unknown)
 1937 - (Unknown)
 1938 - (Unknown)
 1939 - Lachlan

Lyell Miners Football Association (1907−1932)
Clubs included: Linda, North Lyell, Gormanston, Mechanics, Miners, Wrenns, Wanderers.

Premiers
 1907 – Linda
 1921 – Mechanics
 1923 – Linda
 1928 – Rovers
 1929 – Rovers
 1932 – Gormanston

Marrawah Football Association (1923−1932) 
Clubs included: Centrals, Railway, West, Marrawah, East Marrawah and Welcome Swamp Reclaimers. 
Premiers
 1923 – Marrawah
 1925 – East Marrawah
 1926 – Redpa
 1928 – Marrawah
 1931 – No competition

Medhurst Football Association 
Clubs included: Deloraine, Westbury Wanderers and Dunorlan.

PREMIERS
 1909 – Deloraine 6.7 (43) d Dunorlan 2.7 (19)
 1910 – Westbury Wanderers

Metropolitan Football Association 
Clubs included: Battery Point, Glebe, Bellerive, Old Hobartians Association and Old Virgilians Association 
Premiers
 1910 – Bellerive were defeated
 1911–1914 – unknown
 1915 – Bellerive defeated
 1916–1928 – unknown
 1929 – Old Hobartians Association 13.6.84 defeated Old Virgilians Association 4.12.36

Midland Football Association (1921−1971)
Clubs included Campbell Town, Oatlands, Ross and Tunnack.

PREMIERS

 1921 - (Unknown)
 1922 - (Unknown)
 1923 - (Unknown)
 1924 - Campbell Town
 1925 - (Unknown)
 1926 - (Unknown)
 1927 - (Unknown)
 1928 - (Unknown)
 1929 - (Unknown)
 1930 - (Unknown)
 1931 - Campbell Town
 1932 - Campbell Town
 1933 - Oatlands
 1934 - Campbell Town
 1935 - Campbell Town
 1936 - Campbell Town
 1937 - Cleveland
 1938 - Campbell Town
 1939 - Cleveland
 1940 - (Unknown)
 1946 - Ross
 1947 - Tunnack
 1948 - Ross
 1949 - Tunnack
 1950 - Campbell Town
 1951 - Campbell Town
 1952 - Tunnack
 1953 - Oatlands
 1954 - Oatlands
 1955 - Campbell Town
 1956 - Ross
 1957 - Ross
 1958 - Ross
 1959 - Ross
 1960 - Oatlands
 1961 - Campbell Town
 1962 - Oatlands
 1963 - Tunnack
 1964 - Tunnack
 1965 - Oatlands
 1966 - Ross
 1967 - Ross
 1968 - Ross
 1969 - Oatlands
 1970 - Oatlands
 1971 - Oatlands

Mount Farrell Football Association 
(Tullah Football Association)

As Tullah was in the early 20th century an isolated community, teams were made up from the township of Tullah only.

With the construction of the Murchison Highway in 1963 a combined Tullah team competed in the Roseberry, Murchison, and Western Tasmanian competitions at different times.

The competition commenced in 1912. Teams included: Rovers, Tigers, City, Tullah, Federal and Wanderers.

PREMIERS
 1912 - (Unknown)
 1913 - (Unknown)
 1914 - (Unknown)
 1915 - (Unknown)
 1916 - (Unknown)
 1917 - (Unknown)
 1918 - (Unknown)
 1919 - (Unknown)
 1920 - (Unknown)
 1921 - (Unknown)
 1922 - (Unknown)
 1923 - Federal 6.5.41 to Wanderers 3.6.24
 1926 - (Unknown)
 1927 - Federal
 1928 - (Unknown)
 1929 - (Unknown)
 1930 - (Unknown)
 1931 – Tullah 8.20 (68) d Federal 9.9 (63)
 1932 – Tullah d Federal
 1933 - Rovers 15.20 (110) d City 13.11 (89)
 1934 - Rovers
 1935 - Tullah 16.24 (120) d Federal 12.14 (86)
 1936 - Rosebery 5.16 (46) d Zeehan 4.10 (34)

New Norfolk Junior Football Association 
Clubs included: Lachlan, Plenty, Lower Derwent, New Norfolk Juniors, Molesworth and New Norfolk Rovers.

North East Football Association 
A precursor to the North East Football Union.

Premiers

 1922 - Ringarooma
 1923 - Ringarooma
 1924 - Scottsdale
 1925 - Ledgerwood
 1926 - Wanderers
 1927 - Scottsdale
 1928 - Scottsdale
 1929 - Wanderers
 1930 - Ringarooma
 1931 - Ringarooma
 1932 - Winnaleah
 1933 - Alberton
 1934 - Wanderers
 1935 - Alberton
 1936 - Derby

Northern Suburban Football Association 
Clubs included: Druids, South Launceston, Caledonians, East Launceston. 
Premiers
 1924 – Druids

Northern Tasmania District Football League (1952−1963) 
Formed when the NTFA expelled second XVIII clubs so it could a pure reserve grade competition.

Clubs included Deloraine, Exeter, Kings Meadows, Mowbray, Riverside, St. Leonards, Westbury

PREMIERS

 1952 - Deloraine 8.18 (66) d Westbury 6.4 (40)
 1953 - St Leonards 6.12 (48) d Mowbray 3.11 (29)
 1954 - Mowbray 7.18 (60) d St Leonards 8.11 (59)
 1955 - Mowbray 18.7 (115) d Riverside 7.10 (52)
 1956 - Mowbray 15.13 (103) d Deloraine 7.14 (56)
 1957 - Mowbray 14.10 (94) d Deloraine 9.18 (72)
 1958 - Deloraine 17.16 (118) d Mowbray 13.11 (89)
 1959 - Deloraine 12.27 (99) d Mowbray 14.8 (92)
 1960 - Riverside 9.12 (66) d Westbury 6.11 (47)
 1961 - Deloraine 14.15 (99 to Westbury 9.9 (63)
 1962 - Deloraine 12.19 (91) to Mowbray 5.21 (51)
 1963 - Mowbray 12.13 (85) d Westbury 10.9 (69)

Northern Tasmanian Football Association (1886−1986) 

The Northern Tasmanian Football Association (NTFA) was an Australian rules football competition which ran from 1886 to 1986. In its time it was one of the three main leagues in Tasmania and was based in the Launceston and surrounding districts.

Two teams (North Launceston and East Launceston) were to field reserve grade teams at senior level in the competition in 1986 upon joining the TFL Statewide League with a third club – City-South – merging with East Launceston on 26 May 1986.
In 1987 the NTFA merged with the North West Football Union (NWFU) to form the Northern Tasmanian Football League, losing both North Launceston and the merged East Launceston/City-South (South Launceston) club.

North West Football Union (1910−1986) 

The North West Football Union (NWFU) was an Australian rules football competition which ran from 1910 to 1986. In its time it was one of the three main leagues in Tasmania, with the Tasmanian Football League and Northern Tasmanian Football Association representing the rest of the state.

The NWFU ran until the end of the 1986 season when major clubs such as Cooee and Devonport defected to the TFL Statewide League. In 1987 the NWFU merged with the Northern Tasmanian Football Association (NTFA) to form the  Northern Tasmanian Football League.

Oatlands District (Junior) Football Association 
Clubs included: Mt Pleasant, Oatlands, Tunnack, Tunbridge, Mt Seymour and Parratah. 
Premiers
 1932 – Oatlands 12.10.82 defeated Tunnack 8.11.59
 1933 – 1936 unavailable
 1937 – Tunnack defeated Mt Seymour
 1938 – Mt Pleasant defeated Oatlands

Pembroke Football Association (1936−1950) 
Clubs included Forcett, Sorell, Nugent, Bream Creek, Dunalley, Copping, Woodsdale, and Colebrook.

Premiers (Bone Trophy)
 1936 Nugent defeated Forcett
 1937 Sorell 8.11.59 defeated Nugent 7.7.49
 1938 Sorell 8.11.59 defeated Nugent 7.8.50
 1939 Sorell 11.9.75 defeated Dunalley 3.14.32
 1940–1946 Recess (WW2)
 1947 Forcett 14.3.87 defeated Dunalley 11.10.76
 1948 Copping 8.11.59 defeated Dunalley 5.10.40
 1949 Dunalley defeated Copping
 1950 Dunalley defeated Nugent

Peninsula Football Association(1988−2001) 
Main Article: Peninsula Football Association 
The Peninsula Football Association (PFA) was a league from the Tasman Peninsula area of Tasmania that operated between 1988 and 2001.

Portland Football Association (1936−1950) 
The Portland Football Association teams included Anchor, City, George's Bay, Miners, Pyengana, St Helens, Union Rovers, and Weldborough.

Premiers
 1936 – Union Rovers
 1937 – Miners
 1938 – Pyendana
 1939 – Anchor
 1947 – George's Bay 10.19.79 d Pyengana 6.4.40
 1948 – George's Bay 9.13.67 d St Helens 8.18.66
 1950 – Pyengana 13.18.96 d St Helens 7.5.47

Protestant Churches Football Association (−1934) 
Clubs included: Baptists, Methodists, University, Congregationalists, Battery Point Methodists and Hobart Baptists.

Premiers
 1932 – Combined Methodists 16.11.107 defeated University 14.8.92
 1933 – Combined Methodists 13.12.90 defeated Battery Point Methodists 9.12.66
 1934 – Into Recess

Public Service Football Association (1947−1951) 
Clubs included: Hydro Electric, Public Works, Politax, Railways and Tasmanian Government Printers.

Queenborough Football Association (1919−1957) 
clubs included: Army, Blundstones, Canes, Cascade, Claremont, Elliotts Bros, Glenorchy Grove, Glenorchy II, High School, Hydro, IXL, Jay Bee, Kingston, Long Beach, Mount Nelson, North Hobart, Old Hobartians Association, Old Technical Collegians, Postal, Railways, Sandy Bay Juniors, Sutex, Teachers College, Tibbs Bridge, University, YCW

Premiers

 1931 - Sandy Bay Juniors
 1932 - Long Beach
 1933 - Long Beach
 1934 - Long Beach
 1935 - Long Beach
 1936 - Long Beach
 1937 - Old Hobartians Association (OHA)
 1938 - Old Hobartians Association (OHA)
 1939 - Old Technical Collegians (OTC)
 1940 - Tibbs Bridge
 1941 - Navy
 1942 - Long Beach
 1943 - Army Supply
 1944 - Old Hobartians Association (OHA)
 1945 - Old Hobartians Association (OHA) 
 1946 - Claremont
 1947 - Long Beach
 1948 - IXL
 1949 - Long Beach
 1950 - Long Beach
 1951 - IXL
 1952 - Canes
 1953 - Hydro
 1954 - North Hobart 
 1955 - North Hobart
 1956 - Canes
 1957 - Canes

Redpa Football Association (1933−1939) 
Teams included: Top End, Bottom End, Salmon River, Central, Railway, Marrawah, Redpa Wanderers.
Premiers
 1933 – Season abandoned - no premiership rewarded
 1934 – Central 8.7 (55) d Railway 1.4 (10)
 1935–1936 – unavailable
 1937 – Season cancelled
 1938–1939 – unavailable

Richmond Football Association 
Clubs included: Richmond, Campania, Colebrook, Brighton, Bagdad, Kempton, Dunalley and Sorell.
Premiers
 1932 – Campania 4.11 (35) d Tea Tree 3.8 (26)
 1933 – Campania 9.13 (67) d Brighton 5.6 (36)
 1934 – Kempton 11.14 (80) d Campania 8.5 (53)
 1935 – Kempton 7.8 (50) d Campania 4.9 (33)
 1936 – Richmond d Campania
 1937–1939 – Reformed as South Midlands Association
 1940 – unavailable

Ridgley Football Association (1939−1951)
Clubs included: Highclere, Mooreville Road, Ridgley, West Ridgley, Tewkesbury, Wilmot.
Premiers
 1939 – Tewkesbury
 1940 – Ridgley
 1941 – Ridgley
 1945 – Ridgley
 1946 – West Ridgley
 1947 – Ridgley
 1948 – West Ridgley
 1949 – Ridgley
 1950 – Ridgley
 1951 – Mooreville Road

Rosebery Football Association (1922−1962)
Clubs included: Rosebery, Strahan, Toorak, Tullah, Williamsford, Zeehan

 1922 – Williamsford
 1923 – Williamsford
 1924 – Rosebery
 1925 - 
 1926 – Williamsford
 1927 – Rosebery
 1928 – Toorak 10.9 (69) d Williamsford 9.13 (67)
 1929 – Rosebery
 1930 – Rosebery
 1931 – Wiiliamsford
 1932 – Toorak
 1933 – Williamsford
 1934 – Rosebery
 1935 – Williamsford
 1936 – Williamsford
 1937 – Mines United 15.13 (103) d Toorak 10.17 (77)
 1938 – Toorak 11.20 (86) d Mines United 5.6 (36)
 1939 – Tullah
 1940 – Renison Bell
 1944 – Toorak 12.22 (94) d Rosebery 12.12 (84)
 1945 – Tullah 17.20 (122) d Toorak 8.13 (61)
 1946 – Toorak 23.10 (148) d Rosebery 8.12 (60)
 1947 – Williamsford 15.14 (104) d Tullah 12.12 (84)
 1948 – Tullah 19.21 (135) d Toorak 4.9 (33)
 1949 – Rosebery 16.23 (119) d Zeehan 6.11 (47)
 1950 – Tullah 13.26 (104) d Rosebery 10.15 (75)
 1951 – Rosebery 24.14 (158) d Williamford 7.11 (53)
 1952 – Rosebery 12.12 (84) d Toorak 10.9 (69)
 1953 – Toorak 9.10 (64) d Zeehan 4.9 (33)
 1954 – Rosebery d Toorak
 1955 – Rosebery 15.20 (110) d Williamsford 7.10 (52)
 1956 – Williamsford 16.19 (115) d Rosebery 3.5 (23)
 1957 –
 1958 –
 1959 –
 1960 – Rosebery 11.14 (80) d Toorak 9.7 (61)
 1961 – Rosebery 16.19 (115) d Toorak 8.4 (52)
 1962 –

Sorell Football Association (1933−1935) 
Clubs that competed in the competition included Nugent, Sorell, and Bream Creek. All the clubs moved to the Pembroke Football association in 1936.

Premiership cup was known as the McHugh Trophy.

Premiers:
 1933 Sorell 8.9.57 to Nugent 8.5.53

Southern Country Football Association (1923−1933)
A forerunner to the Southern District Football Association.

'Premiers         
         
         
 1923 - Oatlands 9.11 (65) to Richmond 6.8 (44)
 1924 - Unknown.
 1925 - Richmond 9.7 (61) d Oatlands 8.11 (59)
 1926 - Richmond 11.11 (77) d Upper Derwent 10.15 (75)
 1927 - Oatlands 10.14 (74) d New Norfolk 6.6 (42)
 1928 - New Norfolk 9 9 (63) d Richmond 5.8 (38)
 1929 - Upper Derwent 9.8 (62) d Oatlands 6.16 (52)
 1930 - New Norfolk 16.5 (101) d Richmond 10.15 (75)
 1931 - Bothwell 10.11 (71) d Montrose 7.8 (50)
 1932 - Upper Derwent 12.12 (84) d New Norfolk 9.9 (63)
 1933 - New Norfolk 11.4 (70) d Montrose 6.10 (46)

 South East District Football Association (1945−1979) 
Clubs included Bagdad, Bothwell, Campania, Colebrook, Kempton, Mangalore, Maydena, Ouse, Richmond, Sorell, Triabunna, Tunnack and Upper Derwent.

'Premiers         
         
         
 1945 - Richmond 2.12 (24) d Bagdad-Mangalore 1.3 (9)
 1946 - Richmond 8.10 (58) d Bagdad-Mangalore 3.8 (26)
 1947 - Richmond 6.8 (44) d Kempton 3.8 (26)
 1948 - Colebrook 9.16 (70) d Campania 5.10 (40)
 1949 - Campania 9.14 (68) d Colebrook 4.10 (34)
 1950 - Campania defeated Colebrook  
 1951 - Richmond 9.10 (64) d Kempton 5.10 (40)
 1952 - Mangalore 8.14 (62) d Richmond 8.10 (58)
 1953 - Campania 10.9 (69) d Richmond 3.8 (26)
 1954 - Mangalore 8.14 (62) d Campania 6.8 (44)
 1955 - Mangalore 8.9 (57) d Richmond 7.6 (48)
 1956 - Mangalore 11.15 (81) d Campania 5.10 (40)      
 1957 - Mangalore 8.10 (58) d Colebrook 6.7 (43)
 1958 - Richmond 7.19 (61) d Colebrook 6.5 (41)
 1959 - Mangalore defeated Sorell  
 1960 - Sorell 14.10 (94) d Mangalore 11.10 (76)
 1961 - Sorell 11.12 (78) d Campania 7.13 (55)
 1962 - Sorell 13.9 (87) d Campania 12.9 (81)
 1963 - Campania 11.8 (74) d Mangalore 10.10 (70)
 1964 - Richmond 9.6 (60) d Kempton 5.17 (47)
 1965 - Mangalore 10.10 (70) d Cambridge 7.12 (54)
 1966 - Kempton 11.7 (73) d Mangalore 8.11 (59)
 1967 - Triabunna 9.11 (65) d Mangalore 5.10 (40)
 1968 - Mangalore 10.12 (72) d Triabunna 10.11 (71)
 1969 - Colebrook 8.13 (61) d Mangalore 8.10 (58)
 1970 - Mangalore 14.22 (106) d Campania 14.4 (88)
 1971 - Mangalore 13.11 (89) d Triabunna 12.9 (81)
 1972 - Mangalore 18.11 (119) d Tunnack 13.11 (89)
 1973 - Tunnack 12.17 (89) d Mangalore 8.10 (58)
 1974 - Richmond 12.11 (83) d Bothwell 6.4 (40)
 1975 - Upper Derwent 13.18 (96) d Mangalore 11.8 (74)
 1976 - Richmond 14.19 (103) d Upper Derwent 12.11 (83)
 1977 - Mangalore 20.16 (136) d Campania 9.11 (65)
 1978 - Richmond 18.13 (121) d Mangalore 11.9 (75)
 1979 - Mangalore 17.17 (119) d Campania 6.8 (44)

Southern Districts Football Association (1934−1970) 
Clubs included Australian Newsprint Mills (ANM), Bagdad, Bagdad-Mangalore, Bellerive, Bothwell, Bridgewater, Brighton, Clarence, Forcett, Glenorchy Rovers, Hamilton, Mangalore, Maydena, Maydena-Westerway, Montrose, Ouse, Ouse-Wayatinah, Richmond, Upper Derwent, New Norfolk, and South Hobart. 
Glenorchy Rovers were absorbed by New Town Football Club when they moved to KGV in early 1957 and became current TSL club, Glenorchy Magpies.

Premiers      
 1934 – Glenorchy Rovers 13.9 (87) d New Norfolk 4.5 (29)
 1935 – Glenorchy Rovers 14.13 (97) d Montrose 10.12 (72)
 1936 – Glenorchy Rovers 6.3 (39) d Bellerive 4.11 (35)
 1937 – Bellerive 12.9 (81) d Bridgewater 10.6 (66)
 1938 – Bridgewater 15.13 (103) d Bellerive 11.15 (81)
 1939 – New Norfolk 14.9 (93) d Bellerive 12.12 (84)
 1940 – Bellerive 11.9 (75) d Glenorchy Rovers 7.17 (59)
 1945 – New Norfolk 12.12 (84) d Clarence 1.5 (11)
 1946 – Clarence 11.9 (75) d Bothwell 8.10 (58)
 1947 – Bothwell 8.8 (56) d Glenorchy Rovers 7.11 (53)
 1948 – Bothwell 12.8 (80) d Bridgewater 6.7 (43)
 1949 – Bothwell 9.8 (62) d Glenorchy Rovers 9.4 (58)
 1950 – Glenorchy Rovers 9.12 (66) d Bothwell 9.6 (60)
 1951 – Bothwell 10.18 (78) d Glenorchy Rovers 4.6 (30)
 1952 – Bothwell 10.16 (76) d Bridgewater 5.6 (36)
 1953 – Bothwell 15.12 (102) d Glenorchy Rovers 9.12 (66)
 1954 – Bothwell 9.13 (67) d Glenorchy Rovers 2.7 (19)
 1955 – Glenorchy Rovers 12.16 (88) d Bothwell 12.10 (82)
 1956 – Glenorchy Rovers 14.12 (96) d Upper Derwent 8.5 (53)
 1957 – Bridgewater 15.16 (106) d Hamilton 9.11 (65)
 1958 – Bothwell 12.14 (86) d Hamilton 10.22 (82)
 1959 – Hamilton 13.9 (87) d Upper Derwent 5.9 (39)
 1960 – Hamilton 14.9 (93) d Upper Derwent 13.14 (92)
 1961 – Upper Derwent 15.15 (105) d Bothwell 6.9 (45)
 1962 – Upper Derwent 8.6 (54) d Maydena 6.7 (43)
 1963 – Bothwell 13.20 (98) d Hamilton 8.10 (58)
 1964 – Bothwell 7.7 (49) d Maydena 6.4 (40)
 1965 – Hamilton 13.15 (93) d Bothwell 10.14 (74)
 1966 – Bridgewater 10.7 (67) d Maydena 6.15 (51)
 1967 – Ouse 13.14 (92) d Bothwell 8.12 (60)
 1968 – Bothwell 10.8 (68) d Ouse 8.9 (57)
 1969 – Upper Derwent 16.14 (110) d Ouse 8.5 (53)
 1970 – Bothwell 11.6 (72) d Upper Derwent 7.8 (50)

Southern Tasmanian Football Association 
Formerly the Hobart Junior Football Association

Clubs included: Crescent, Excelsior and Brisbane Rovers. 
Premiers
 1910 – Excelsior

Southern Tasmanian Football Association (1976−1986) 
Formerly the Associated Youth Clubs.
Clubs included: Bothwell, Buckingham, Cambridge, Lachlan, Maydena, Metropolitan, North Derwent, Railway, Risdon Cove, Risdon Vale, Upper Derwent & West Hobart.

Premiers

 1976 – Lachlan 17.12 (114) d Metropolitan 13.8 (86)
 1977 – Railway 15.15 (105) d West Hobart 11.14 (80)
 1978 – Buckingham 12.5 (77) d Railway 8.5 (53)
 1979 – Lachlan 14.17 (101) d Railway 12.2 (74)
 1980 – Lachlan 8.13 (61) d Bothwell 5.9 (39)
 1981 – Lachlan 16.12 (108) d West Hobart 14.13 (97)
 1982 – West Hobart 21.13 (139) d Bothwell 11.3 (69)
 1983 – Bothwell 10.12 (72) d Lachlan 10.8 (68)
 1984 – Lachlan 15.16 (106) d Bothwell 7.3 (45)
 1985 – Bothwell 10.10 (70) d Lachlan 6.12 (48)
 1986 – Lachlan 14.11 (95) d Maydena 11.9 (75)

Table Cape Football Association (1923−1952) 
Clubs included: Burnie Juniors, Boat Harbour, Flowerdale, Henrietta Rovers, Myalla, Rocky Cape, Seabrook, Wynyard Jrs, Yeoman & Yolla

 1923 – Wynyard 5.12.42 d Yeoman 4.14.38
 1924 – Yolla 3.12.30 d Wynyard 4.0.24
 1925 – Yeoman 7.14.56 d Somerset 3.9.27
 1926 – Yeoman 9.11.65 d Wynyard 3.4.22
 1927 – Burnie Jrs 12.18.90 d Yolla 1.8.14
 1928 – Yeoman 8.20.68 d Wynyard Jrs 3.5.23
 1929 – Yeoman 5.5.35 d Wanderers 3.4.22
 1930 – Yeoman 7.13.55 d Myalla 6.5.41
 1931 – Yeoman 8.16.64 d Flowerdale 7.10.52
 1932 – Myalla 10.4.64 d Seabrook 7.13.55
 1933 – Seabrook 9.13.67 d Gymnasium 4.6.30
 1934 – Seabrook 5.10.40 d Wynyard 3.7.25
 1935 – Wynyard 11.11.77 d Seabrook 9.9.63
 1936 – Wynyard 9.11.65 d Boat harbour 5.9.39
 1937 – Boat Harbour 6.10.46 d Myalla 3.3.21
 1938 – Myalla 4.8.32 d Boat Harbour 1.4.10
 1939 – Myalla 6.9.45 d Boat Harbor 5.5.35
 1946 – Rocky Cape 8.10.58 d Myalla 7.7.49
 1947 – Boat Harbour 10.11.71 d Myalla 4.14.38
 1948 – Myalla 6.11.47 d Rocky Cape 6.9.45
 1949 – Rocky Cape 7.5.47 d Myalla 4.3.27
 1950 – Flowerdale 9.7.61 d Myalla 8.11.59
 1951 – Mt Hicks 5.11.41 d Myalla 3.4.22
 1952 – Flowerdale Vs Mt Hicks

Tamar Football Association (1970−1984) 
Formed when it became possible to drive across the Tamar River with the opening of the Batman Bridge in 1968. The East Tamar and West Tamar Football association merged in 1970.

Clubs included Beaconsfield, Beauty Point, Bridgenorth, Exeter, George Town, Hillwood, Karoola, Lilydale, Rosevears.

Premiers

 1970 – Exeter 11.9 (75) d Beauty Point 10.9 (69)
 1971 – George Town 9.14 (68) d Exeter 2.12 (24)
 1972 – George Town 21.9 (135) d Beauty Point 11.9 (75)
 1973 – George Town 11.15 (81) d Beauty Point 10.6 (66)
 1974 – Beaconsfield 14.8 (92) d Exeter 11.14 (80)
 1975 – Exeter 11.14 (80) d Karoola 9.6 (60)
 1976 – Beaconsfield 23.15 (153) d George Town 13.12 (90)
 1977 – George Town 13.11 (89) d Karoola 8.10 (58)
 1978 – Beauty Point 15.14 (104) d Beaconsfield 12.14 (86)
 1979 – George Town 12.6 (78) d Lilydale 8.11 (59)
 1980 – Exeter 11.10 (76) d George Town 10.5 (65)
 1981 – Beaconsfield 11.18 (84) d George Town 9.19 (73)
 1982 – George Town 12.5 (77) d Bridgenorth 11.10 (76)
 1983 – Bridgenorth 18.13 (121) d George Town 13.10 (88)
 1984 – Bridgenorth 20.14 (134) d Hillwood 14.11 (95)

Tasman Football Association (1919−2001) 
Main Article:Tasman Football Association
The Tasman Football Association was a competition made up of clubs from the Tasman peninsula and areas and suburbs East of Hobart. In its latter years it also contained a team from the Derwent Valley (North Derwent FC) and the Hobart inner suburb of New Town (Railway FC).

Tyenna Football Association 
Clubs included Bronte Park, Ellendale, Fitzgerald, Hamilton, Keamaree, Lachlan, Maydena, Molesworth, National Park, Ouse, Plenty, Tyenna, Upper Derwent, Upper Derwent Juniors, Wayatinah and Westerway.

Premiers

 Russell Football Association 1st year
 1921 Not known
 1922 Tyenna 5.6.36 to Westerway 4.5.29
 1923 Tyenna but disputed
 1924 Westerway 6.10.46 to Upper Derwent Jrs 5.6.36
 name changed to Forest Hill Association
 1925 National Park, undefeated, no final
 1926 Not known
 1927 Upper Derwent Jrs 14.5.89 to National Park 8.13.61
 name changed to Tyenna Football Association
 1929 – Not known
 1930 Fitzgerald 5.9.39 to National Park 4.5.29
 1937 Fitzgerald 6.15.51 to Westerway 6.4.40
 1938 Westerway 8.9.57 to Fitzgerald 4.6.30
 1939 Ellendale 9.10.64 to Fitzgerald 8.15.63 after 2 drawn games.
 1940 Hamilton 8.15.63 to Ellendale 8.9.57
 1942–1944 recess due to War
 1945 Upper Derwent 10.17.77 to Hamilton 4.7.31
 1946 Ellendale played Upper Derwent Juniors ?? result
 1947 Lachlan 5.12.42 to Ellendale 4.15.39
 1948 Lachlan 7.7.49 to Ellendale 6.6.42
 1949 to 1951 Association in recess
 1952 Ellendale defeated Maydena by 2 points (scores not known)
 1953 Molesworth 11.6.72 to Plenty 5.8.38
 1954 Plenty 5.12.42 to Lachlan 3.7.25
 1955 Molesworth 10.10.70 to Bronte Park 8.11.59
 1956 Plenty 6.7.43 to Maydena 5.6.36
 1957 Maydena 12.17.89 to Wayatinah 7.8.50
 1958 Maydena 7.10.52 to Wayatinah 6.9.45
This Association closed after the 1958 season.

Waratah Football Association
Clubs included Bischoff, Magnet, Parrawe, Waratah

West Tamar Football Association (1920−1969) 
Clubs included Beaconsfield, Beauty Point, Bridgenorth, Exeter, Frankford, Rosevears, Rowella & Sidmouth.

Premiers 
 1921 – Sidmouth 5.9 (39) d Rosevears 1.11 (17)
 1923 – Rosevears 9.11 (65) d Sidmouth 4.6 (30) 
 1925 – Beaconsfield 9.11 (65) d Rosevears 8.14 (62)
 1926 – Sidmouth
 1927 – Beaconsfield
 1928 – Sidmouth
 1929 – Bridgenorth
 1930 – Rosevears
 1931 – Beaconsfield
 1932 – Sidmouth
 1933 – Beaconsfield
 1934 – Sidmouth 19.14 (128) d Bridgenorth 13.18 (96)
 1935 – Sidmouth 12.13 (85) d Beaconsfield 2.1 (13)
 1936 – Sidmouth
 1937 – Sidmouth
 1938 – Sidmouth
 1939 – Sidmouth
 1940 – Sidmouth
 1945 – Sidmouth
 1946 – Sidmouth
 1947 – Beaconsfield
 1948 – Beaconsfield
 1949 – Bridgenorth
 1950 – Bridgenorth
 1951 – Bridgenorth
 1952 – Bridgenorth
 1953 – Beaconsfield
 1954 – Exeter 7.12 (54) d Bridgenorth 3.13 (31)
 1955 – Exeter 14.18 (102) d Beaconsfield 2.2 (14)
 1956 – Bridgenorth 13.13 (91) d Beauty Point 10.9 (69)
 1957 – Beauty Point 12.19 (91) d Beaconsfield 13.9 (87)
 1958 – Beaconsfield
 1959 – Bridgenorth
 1960 – Bridgenorth
 1961 – Sidmouth
 1962 – Beauty Point
 1963 – Bridgenorth
 1964 – Beauty Point
 1965 – Beaconsfield
 1966 – Rosevears 9.12 (66) d Beaconsfield 8.15 (63)
 1967 – Bridgenorth 10.3 (63) d Beaconsfield 6.19 (55)
 1968 – Rosevears 4.13 (37) d Exeter 4.8 (32)
 1969 – Rosevears 16.21 (117) d Exeter 5.13 (43)

Western Tasmanian Football Association (1924−1994) 
Main Article: Western Tasmanian Football Association 
The Western Tasmanian Football Association was a competition based on Tasmania's West Coast, and was mostly made up of miners that lived and worked in the area.

Zeehan Football Association (1908−1952)

Premiers
 1908 – (Unknown)
 1909 – Zeehan
 1910 – Commonwealth
 1911 – Silver King
 1912 – Silver King
 1913 – Silver King
 1914 – Zeehan
 1919 – Commonwealth
 1920 – (Unknown)
 1921 – Centrals
 1922 – (Unknown)
 1923 – East Zeehan
 1924 – East Zeehan
 1925 – East Zeehan
 1926 – East Zeehan
 1927 – East Zeehan
 1928 – East Zeehan
 1929 – East Zeehan
 1930 – East Zeehan
 1931 – City
 1932 – City
 1933 – Wanderers
 1934 – Wanderers
 1935 – Wanderers
 1936 – Wanderers
 1937 – Wanderers
 1938 – Renison Bell 9.14.68 d Smelters 5.7.37
 1939 – (Unknown)
 1940-1944 - Recess
 1945 – (Unknown)
 1946 – (Unknown)
 1947 – (Unknown)
 1948 – (Unknown)
 1949 – (Unknown)
 1950 – (Unknown)
 1951 – West Zeehan
 1952 – Strahan

Notes

References
 Australian rules football in Tasmania – 2001 / edited by John Stoward 0957751567
 The Mercury newspaper – Hobart
 The Examiner newspaper – Launceston
 The Advocate newspaper – Burnie

 
Australian rules football competitions in Tasmania, former
Tasmania, Former Competitions